The women's singles tennis event was part of the tennis programme and took place between December 12 and 17, at the Muang Thong Thani Tennis Centre.

Schedule
All times are Indochina Time (UTC+07:00)

Results

Final

Top half

Bottom half

References 

1998 Asian Games Tennis Results
People Daily 1998 Asian Games Results
Tennis India Homepage

Tennis at the 1998 Asian Games